This is a list of members of the 12th Bundestag – the lower house of parliament of the Federal Republic of Germany, whose members were elected in the 1990 federal election and served in office from 1990 until 1994.

This session also appointed observers to the European Parliament from East Germany.



Summary 
This summary includes changes in the numbers of the five caucuses (CDU/CSU, SPD, Greens, FDP, Party of Democratic Socialism):

Members

A 
 Else Ackermann, CDU (from 22 October 1991)
 Ulrich Adam, CDU
 Brigitte Adler, SPD
 Ina Albowitz, FDP
 Peter Alltschekow, SPD (from 3 August 1994)
 Walter Altherr, CDU
 Gerd Andres, SPD
 Robert Antretter, SPD
 Anneliese Augustin, CDU
 Jürgen Augustinowitz, CDU
 Dietrich Austermann, CDU

B 
 Gisela Babel, FDP
 Hermann Bachmaier, SPD
 Angelika Barbe, SPD
 Heinz-Günter Bargfrede, CDU
 Holger Bartsch, SPD
 Wolf Bauer, CDU
 Gerhart Baum, FDP
 Brigitte Baumeister, CDU
 Richard Bayha, CDU (until 3 November 1993)
 Helmuth Becker, SPD
 Ingrid Becker-Inglau, SPD
 Klaus Beckmann, FDP (until 27 May 1994)
 Meinrad Belle, CDU
 Reinhard Meyer zu Bentrup, CDU
 Hans Berger, SPD
 Sabine Bergmann-Pohl, CDU
 Hans Gottfried Bernrath, SPD
 Walter Bersch, SPD (from 22 August 1994)
 Friedhelm Julius Beucher, SPD
 Hans-Dirk Bierling, CDU
 Rudolf Bindig, SPD
 Joseph-Theodor Blank, CDU
 Renate Blank, CSU
 Petra Bläss, PDS
 Heribert Blens, CDU
 Peter Bleser, CDU
 Norbert Blüm, CDU
 Lieselott Blunck, SPD
 Michaela Blunk, FDP (from 7 August 1992)
 Thea Bock, SPD (from 4 July 1991)
 Friedrich Bohl, CDU
 Wilfried Bohlsen, CDU
 Wilfried Böhm, CDU
 Ulrich Böhme, SPD
 Maria Böhmer, CDU
 Jochen Borchert, CDU
 Wolfgang Börnsen, CDU
 Arne Börnsen, SPD
 Wolfgang Bötsch, CSU
 Jutta Braband, PDS (until 2 May 1992)
 Klaus Brähmig, CDU
 Willy Brandt, SPD (until 8 October 1992)
 Anni Brandt-Elsweier, SPD
 Eberhard Brecht, SPD
 Günther Bredehorn, FDP
 Paul Breuer, CDU
 Ulrich Briefs, PDS
 Monika Brudlewsky, CDU
 Georg Brunnhuber, CDU
 Hans Büchler, SPD
 Peter Büchner, SPD (from 10 June 1991)
 Klaus Bühler, CDU
 Edelgard Bulmahn, SPD
 Andreas von Bülow, SPD
 Ulla Burchardt, SPD
 Hans Martin Bury, SPD
 Hartmut Büttner, CDU
 Hans Büttner, SPD
 Dankward Buwitt, CDU

C 
 Manfred Carstens, CDU
 Peter Harry Carstensen, CDU
 Marion Caspers-Merk, SPD
 Wolf-Michael Catenhusen, SPD
 Joachim Clemens, CDU
 Peter Conradi, SPD
 Dieter-Julius Cronenberg, FDP

D 
 Klaus Daubertshäuser, SPD
 Herta Däubler-Gmelin, SPD
 Diether Dehm, SPD (from 16 August 1994)
 Wolfgang Dehnel, CDU
 Gertrud Dempwolf, CDU
 Karl Deres, CDU
 Albert Deß, CSU
 Nils Diederich, SPD
 Renate Diemers, CDU
 Karl Diller, SPD
 Marliese Dobberthien, SPD
 Hubert Doppmeier, CDU (until 8 March 1992)
 Werner Dörflinger, CDU
 Hansjürgen Doss, CDU
 Alfred Dregger, CDU
 Rudolf Dreßler, SPD
 Freimut Duve, SPD

E 
 Eike Ebert, SPD
 Jürgen Echternach, CDU
 Peter Eckardt, SPD
 Wolfgang Ehlers, CDU
 Horst Ehmke, SPD
 Udo Ehrbar, CDU
 Ludwig Eich, SPD
 Maria Eichhorn, CSU
 Norbert Eimer, FDP
 Konrad Elmer, SPD
 Hans A. Engelhard, FDP
 Wolfgang Engelmann, CDU
 Dagmar Enkelmann, PDS
 Rainer Eppelmann, CDU
 Wolfgang Erler, CDU (from 6 September 1993)
 Gernot Erler, SPD
 Jörg van Essen, FDP
 Helmut Esters, SPD
 Carl Ewen, SPD
 Horst Eylmann, CDU
 Anke Eymer, CDU

F 
 Ilse Falk, CDU
 Kurt Faltlhauser, CSU
 Klaus-Dieter Feige, Bündnis 90/Die Grünen
 Jochen Feilcke, CDU
 Olaf Feldmann, FDP
 Karl H Fell, CDU
 Elke Ferner, SPD
 Dirk Fischer, CDU
 Leni Fischer, CDU
 Ursula Fischer, PDS
 Evelin Fischer, SPD
 Lothar Fischer, SPD
 Winfried Fockenberg, CDU
 Norbert Formanski, SPD
 Klaus Francke, CDU
 Herbert Frankenhauser, CSU
 Paul Friedhoff, FDP
 Gerhard Friedrich, CSU
 Horst Friedrich, FDP
 Erich G Fritz, CDU
 Ruth Fuchs, PDS (from 11 March 1992)
 Anke Fuchs, SPD
 Katrin Fuchs, SPD
 Hans-Joachim Fuchtel, CDU
 Arne Fuhrmann, SPD
 Rainer Funke, FDP
 Margret Funke-Schmitt-Rink, FDP

G 
 Georg Gallus, FDP
 Jörg Wolfgang Ganschow, FDP
 Monika Ganseforth, SPD
 Norbert Gansel, SPD
 Johannes Ganz, CDU
 Hans H. Gattermann, FDP (until 27 January 1994)
 Fritz Gautier, SPD
 Sissy Geiger, CDU (from 29 September 1992)
 Michaela Geiger, CSU
 Norbert Geis, CSU
 Hans Geisler, CDU (until 12 February 1991)
 Heiner Geißler, CDU
 Wolfgang von Geldern, CDU
 Hans-Dietrich Genscher, FDP
 Florian Gerster, SPD (until 7 June 1991)
 Johannes Gerster, CDU
 Horst Gibtner, CDU
 Konrad Gilges, SPD
 Iris Gleicke, SPD
 Michael Glos, CSU
 Peter Glotz, SPD
 Reinhard Göhner, CDU
 Rose Götte, SPD (until 7 June 1991)
 Martin Göttsching, CDU
 Peter Götz, CDU
 Wolfgang Götzer, CSU
 Günter Graf, SPD
 Joachim Gres, CDU
 Ekkehard Gries, FDP
 Wolfgang Gröbl, CSU
 Elisabeth Grochtmann, CDU
 Achim Großmann, SPD
 Claus-Peter Grotz, CDU
 Josef Grünbeck, FDP
 Martin Grüner, FDP
 Joachim Grünewald, CDU
 Horst Günther, CDU
 Joachim Günther, FDP
 Karlheinz Guttmacher, FDP
 Gregor Gysi, PDS

H 
 Karl Hermann Haack, SPD
 Heinz-Dieter Hackel, FDP
 Hans-Joachim Hacker, SPD
 Gerlinde Hämmerle, SPD (until 31 July 1994)
 Carl-Detlev Freiherr von Hammerstein, CDU
 Manfred Hampel, SPD
 Lothar Handschack, CDU (from 1 July 1994)
 Christel Hanewinckel, SPD
 Dirk Hansen, FDP
 Klaus Harries, CDU
 Liesel Hartenstein, SPD
 Gottfried Haschke, CDU
 Udo Haschke, CDU
 Klaus Hasenfratz, SPD
 Gerda Hasselfeldt, CSU
 Ingomar Hauchler, SPD
 Rainer Haungs, CDU
 Otto Hauser, CDU
 Hansgeorg Hauser, CSU
 Helmut Haussmann, FDP
 Klaus-Jürgen Hedrich, CDU
 Ulrich Heinrich, FDP
 Manfred Heise, CDU
 Dieter Heistermann, SPD
 Renate Hellwig, CDU
 Herbert Helmrich, CDU (until 21 May 1992)
 Bernd Henn, PDS
 Ottfried Hennig, CDU (until 31 May 1992)
 Adolf Herkenrath, CDU
 Norbert Herr, CDU (from 11 November 1993)
 Uwe-Jens Heuer, PDS
 Günther Heyenn, SPD
 Maria Anna Hiebing, CDU (from 8 December 1993)
 Reinhold Hiller, SPD
 Stephan Hilsberg, SPD
 Ernst Hinsken, CSU
 Peter Hintze, CDU
 Burkhard Hirsch, FDP
 Walter Hitschler, FDP
 Paul Hoffacker, CDU
 Barbara Höll, PDS
 Josef Hollerith, CSU
 Uwe Holtz, SPD
 Birgit Homburger, FDP
 Erwin Horn, SPD
 Karl-Heinz Hornhues, CDU
 Siegfried Hornung, CDU
 Heinz-Adolf Hörsken, CDU
 Joachim Hörster, CDU
 Sigrid Hoth, FDP
 Werner Hoyer, FDP
 Heinz Hübner, FDP (until 12 May 1992)
 Gunter Huonker, SPD
 Hubert Hüppe, CDU (from 1 February 1991)

I 
 Lothar Ibrügger, SPD
 Ulrich Irmer, FDP
 Gabriele Iwersen, SPD

J 
 Susanne Jaffke, CDU
 Claus Jäger, CDU
 Renate Jäger, SPD
 Bernhard Jagoda, CDU (until 7 February 1993)
 Friedrich-Adolf Jahn, CDU
 Georg Janovsky, CDU
 Ilse Janz, SPD
 Ulrich Janzen, SPD
 Horst Jaunich, SPD
 Ulla Jelpke, PDS
 Karin Jeltsch, CDU
 Uwe Jens, SPD
 Dionys Jobst, CSU
 Jens Jordan, FDP (from 8 June 1994)
 Rainer Jork, CDU
 , CDU
 Volker Jung, SPD
 Ulrich Junghanns, CDU
 Horst Jungmann, SPD
 Egon Jüttner, CDU

K 
 Harald Kahl, CDU
 Bartholomäus Kalb, CSU
 Steffen Kampeter, CDU
 Dietmar Kansy, CDU
 Franz-Hermann Kappes, CDU (until 24 August 1992)
 Irmgard Karwatzki, CDU
 Susanne Kastner, SPD
 Ernst Kastning, SPD
 Volker Kauder, CDU
 Peter Keller, CSU
 Dietmar Keller, PDS
 Hans-Peter Kemper, SPD (from 3 May 1993)
 Ignaz Kiechle, CSU
 Klaus Kirschner, SPD
 Peter Kittelmann, CDU
 Marianne Klappert, SPD
 Günter Klein, CDU
 Hans Klein, CSU
 Detlef Kleinert, FDP
 Karl-Heinz Klejdzinski, SPD (from 30 October 1992)
 Siegrun Klemmer, SPD
 Ulrich Klinkert, CDU
 Hans-Ulrich Klose, SPD
 Hans-Hinrich Knaape, SPD
 Helmut Kohl, CDU
 Hans-Ulrich Köhler, CDU
 Volkmar Köhler, CDU
 Roland Kohn, FDP
 Heinrich Leonhard Kolb, FDP
 Manfred Kolbe, CDU
 Regina Kolbe, SPD
 Walter Kolbow, SPD
 Rolf Koltzsch, SPD
 Ingrid Köppe, Bündnis 90/Die Grünen
 Jürgen Koppelin, FDP
 Fritz Rudolf Körper, SPD
 Eva-Maria Kors, CDU
 Hans Koschnick, SPD
 Hartmut Koschyk, CSU
 Thomas Kossendey, CDU
 Rudolf Kraus, CSU
 Günther Krause, CDU
 Wolfgang Krause, CDU
 Rudolf Karl Krause, CDU
 Volkmar Kretkowski, SPD
 Franz Heinrich Krey, CDU
 Arnulf Kriedner, CDU
 Heinz-Jürgen Kronberg, CDU
 , CDU
 Reiner Krziskewitz, CDU
 Horst Kubatschka, SPD
 Wolfgang Kubicki, FDP (until 2 August 1992)
 Klaus Kübler, SPD
 Hinrich Kuessner, SPD
 Eckart Kuhlwein, SPD
 Uwe Küster, SPD

L 
 Karl-Hans Laermann, FDP
 Uwe Lambinus, SPD
 Otto Graf Lambsdorff, FDP
 Karl Lamers, CDU
 Norbert Lammert, CDU
 Helmut Lamp, CDU
 Brigitte Lange, SPD
 Detlev von Larcher, SPD
 Herbert Lattmann, CDU
 Paul Laufs, CDU
 Karl-Josef Laumann, CDU
 Andrea Lederer, PDS
 Klaus-Heiner Lehne, CDU (from 12 March 1992)
 Ursula Lehr, CDU
 Robert Leidinger, SPD
 Klaus Lennartz, SPD
 Christian Lenzer, CDU
 Elke Leonhard, SPD
 Sabine Leutheusser-Schnarrenberger, FDP
 Immo Lieberoth, CDU
 Editha Limbach, CDU
 Walter Link, CDU
 Eduard Lintner, CSU
 Klaus Lippold, CDU
 Manfred Lischewski, CDU
 Wolfgang Lohmann, CDU
 Klaus Lohmann, SPD
 Christa Lörcher, SPD (from 3 September 1993)
 Julius Louven, CDU
 Ortwin Lowack, CSU
 Sigrun Löwisch, CDU (from 12 October 1991)
 Christine Lucyga, SPD
 Wolfgang Lüder, FDP
 Uwe Lühr, FDP
 Heinrich Lummer, CDU
 Michael Luther, CDU

M 
 Erich Maaß, CDU
 Dieter Maaß, SPD
 Theo Magin, CDU
 Dietrich Mahlo, CDU
 Lothar de Maizière, CDU (until 15 October 1991)
 Ursula Männle, CSU
 Claire Marienfeld, CDU
 Erwin Marschewski, CDU
 Günter Marten, CDU
 Dorothea Marx, SPD
 Ulrike Mascher, SPD
 Christoph Matschie, SPD
 Dietmar Matterne, SPD
 Ingrid Matthäus-Maier, SPD
 Heide Mattischeck, SPD
 Martin Mayer, CSU
 Markus Meckel, SPD
 Wolfgang Meckelburg, CDU
 Ulrike Mehl, SPD
 Rudolf Meinl, CDU
 Herbert Meißner, SPD
 Bruno Menzel, FDP
 Angela Merkel, CDU
 Franz-Josef Mertens, SPD
 Hedda Meseke, CDU (until 6 December 1993)
 Jürgen Meyer, SPD
 Maria Michalk, CDU (from 13 February 1991)
 Meinolf Michels, CDU
 Klaus Mildner, CDU
 Wolfgang Mischnick, FDP
 Hans Modrow, PDS
 Jürgen Möllemann, FDP
 Franz Möller, CDU
 Thomas Molnar, CDU
 Siegmar Mosdorf, SPD
 Elmar Müller, CDU
 Hans-Werner Müller, CDU
 Alfons Müller, CDU
 Günther Müller, CSU
 Michael Müller, SPD
 Albrecht Müller, SPD
 , SPD
 Jutta Müller, SPD
 , SPD
 Franz Müntefering, SPD (until 8 December 1992)

N 
 Engelbert Nelle, CDU
 Christian Neuling, CDU
 Bernd Neumann, CDU
 Volker Neumann, SPD
 Gerhard Neumann, SPD
 Erhard Niedenthal, CDU (from 8 February 1993)
 Edith Niehuis, SPD
 Rolf Niese, SPD
 Horst Niggemeier, SPD
 Heike Niggemeyer, SPD (from 22 October 1992 until 29 October 1992)
 Johannes Nitsch, CDU
 Claudia Nolte, CDU
 Günther Friedrich Nolting, FDP

O 
 Doris Odendahl, SPD
 Günter Oesinghaus, SPD
 Rolf Olderog, CDU
 Jan Oostergetelo, SPD
 Manfred Opel, SPD
 Rainer Ortleb, FDP
 Friedhelm Ost, CDU
 Adolf Ostertag, SPD
 Eduard Oswald, CSU
 Norbert Otto, CDU
 Hans-Joachim Otto, FDP
 Helga Otto, SPD

P 
 Johann Paintner, FDP
 Kurt Palis, SPD (from 12 July 1993)
 Detlef Parr, FDP (from 1 February 1994)
 Gerhard Päselt, CDU
 Peter Paterna, SPD
 Peter Paziorek, CDU
 Willfried Penner, SPD
 Hans-Wilhelm Pesch, CDU
 Horst Peter, SPD
 Lisa Peters, FDP
 Ulrich Petzold, CDU
 Martin Pfaff, SPD
 Gerhard O Pfeffermann, CDU (until 6 September 1993)
 Anton Pfeifer, CDU
 Angelika Pfeiffer, CDU
 Gero Pfennig, CDU
 Friedbert Pflüger, CDU
 Albert Pfuhl, SPD
 Ingeborg Philipp, PDS (from 21 May 1992)
 Eckhart Pick, SPD
 Winfried Pinger, CDU
 Ronald Pofalla, CDU
 Eva Pohl, FDP
 Hermann Pohler, CDU
 Gerd Poppe, Bündnis 90/Die Grünen
 Joachim Poß, SPD
 Rosemarie Priebus, CDU
 Albert Probst, CSU
 Bernd Protzner, CSU
 Rudolf Purps, SPD
 Dieter Pützhofen, CDU

R 
 Susanne Rahardt-Vahldieck, CDU
 Hans Raidel, CSU
 Peter Ramsauer, CSU
 Hermann Rappe, SPD
 Rolf Rau, CDU
 Peter Rauen, CDU
 Wilhelm Rawe, CDU
 Gerhard Reddemann, CDU
 Otto Regenspurger, CSU
 Klaus Reichenbach, CDU
 Manfred Reimann, SPD
 Bertold Mathias Reinartz, CDU
 Erika Reinhardt, CDU
 Walter Rempe, SPD (until 22 April 1993)
 Margot von Renesse, SPD
 Renate Rennebach, SPD
 Hans-Peter Repnik, CDU
 Otto Reschke, SPD
 Peter Reuschenbach, SPD
 Bernd Reuter, SPD
 Manfred Richter, FDP
 Norbert Rieder, CDU
 Erich Riedl, CSU
 Gerhard Riege, PDS (until 15 February 1992)
 Klaus Riegert, CDU (from 10 June 1992)
 Heinz Riesenhuber, CDU
 Hermann Rind, FDP
 Werner Ringkamp, CDU (from 1 June 1992)
 Günter Rixe, SPD
 Helmut Rode, CDU
 Klaus Röhl, FDP
 Ingrid Roitzsch, CDU
 Franz Romer, CDU
 Hannelore Rönsch, CDU
 Klaus Rose, CSU
 Kurt Rossmanith, CSU
 Wolfgang Roth, SPD (until 2 September 1992)
 Adolf Roth (Gießen), CDU
 Heinz Rother, CDU
 Christian Ruck, CSU
 Volker Rühe, CDU
 Jürgen Rüttgers, CDU

S 
 Helmut Sauer, CDU
 Roland Sauer, CDU
 Harald B Schäfer, SPD (until 27 June 1992)
 Helmut Schäfer, FDP
 Gudrun Schaich-Walch, SPD
 Dieter Schanz, SPD
 Heribert Scharrenbroich, CDU (until 23 March 1994)
 Günther Schartz, CDU
 Ortrun Schätzle, CDU
 Wolfgang Schäuble, CDU
 Hermann Scheer, SPD
 Siegfried Scheffler, SPD
 Manfred Schell, CDU (from 22 July 1993)
 Heinz Schemken, CDU
 Christina Schenk, Bündnis 90/Die Grünen
 Gerhard Scheu, CSU
 Otto Schily, SPD
 Dieter Schloten, SPD
 Günter Schluckebier, SPD
 Ulrich Schmalz, CDU
 Cornelia Schmalz-Jacobsen, FDP
 Bernd Schmidbauer, CDU
 Horst Schmidbauer, SPD
 Christa Schmidt, CDU (from 1 February 1994)
 Joachim Schmidt, CDU
 , CDU
 Trudi Schmidt, CDU
 Christian Schmidt, CSU
 Arno Schmidt, FDP
 Ulla Schmidt, SPD
 Renate Schmidt, SPD
 , SPD
 Regina Schmidt-Zadel, SPD
 Jürgen Schmieder, FDP
 Hans Peter Schmitz, CDU
 Michael von Schmude, CDU
 Jürgen Schmude, SPD
 Oscar Schneider, CSU
 Emil Schnell, SPD
 Christoph Schnittler, FDP (from 22 May 1992)
 Andreas Schockenhoff, CDU
 Rudolf Schöfberger, SPD
 Walter Schöler, SPD (from 8 December 1992)
 Rupert Scholz, CDU
 Joachim Graf von Schönburg-Glauchau, CDU (until 30 June 1994)
 Reinhard von Schorlemer, CDU
 Harald Schreiber, CDU (until 30 June 1993)
 Ottmar Schreiner, SPD
 Conrad Schroeder, CDU (until 20 October 1991)
 Gisela Schröter, SPD
 Karl-Heinz Schröter, SPD
 Wolfgang Schulhoff, CDU
 Dieter Schulte, CDU
 Brigitte Schulte, SPD
 Werner Schulz, Bündnis 90/Die Grünen
 Gerhard Schulz, CDU
 Fritz Schumann, PDS
 Gerhard Schüßler, FDP
 Hans P H Schuster, FDP
 Werner Schuster, SPD
 Dietmar Schütz, SPD
 Irmgard Schwaetzer, FDP
 Clemens Schwalbe, CDU
 Ernst Schwanhold, SPD
 Rolf Schwanitz, SPD
 Stefan Schwarz, CDU
 Christian Schwarz-Schilling, CDU
 Hermann Schwörer, CDU
 Horst Seehofer, CSU
 Heinrich Seesing, CDU
 Marita Sehn, FDP
 Wilfried Seibel, CDU
 Bodo Seidenthal, SPD
 Ilja Seifert, PDS
 Ursula Seiler-Albring, FDP
 Rudolf Seiters, CDU
 Sigrid Semper, FDP
 Lisa Seuster, SPD
 Horst Sielaff, SPD
 Jürgen Sikora, CDU (from 22 May 1992)
 Erika Simm, SPD
 Johannes Singer, SPD
 Sigrid Skarpelis-Sperk, SPD
 Werner Skowron, CDU
 Hartmut Soell, SPD
 Hermann Otto Solms, FDP
 Cornelie Sonntag-Wolgast, SPD
 Hans-Joachim Sopart, CDU (until 3 January 1993)
 Wieland Sorge, SPD
 Bärbel Sothmann, CDU
 Dietrich Sperling, SPD
 Karl-Heinz Spilker, CSU
 Carl-Dieter Spranger, CSU
 Rudolf Sprung, CDU
 Angela Stachowa, PDS
 Jürgen Starnick, FDP
 Lutz Stavenhagen, CDU (until 31 May 1992)
 Antje-Marie Steen, SPD
 Erika Steinbach-Hermann, CDU
 Heinz-Alfred Steiner, SPD
 Hans Stercken, CDU
 Wolfgang von Stetten, CDU
 Ludwig Stiegler, SPD
 Karl Stockhausen, CDU
 Gerhard Stoltenberg, CDU
 Hans-Gerd Strube, CDU
 Peter Struck, SPD
 Michael Stübgen, CDU
 Egon Susset, CDU
 Rita Süssmuth, CDU
 Dorothea Szwed, CDU (from 24 March 1994)

T 
 Joachim Tappe, SPD
 Cornelia von Teichman und Logischen, FDP
 Margitta Terborg, SPD
 Gerald Thalheim, SPD
 Carl-Ludwig Thiele, FDP
 Wolfgang Thierse, SPD
 Dieter Thomae, FDP
 Günther Tietjen, SPD (until 7 July 1993)
 Ferdinand Tillmann, CDU
 Jürgen Timm, FDP
 Uta Titze-Stecher, SPD
 Hans-Günther Toetemeyer, SPD
 Klaus Töpfer, CDU
 Jürgen Türk, FDP

U 
 Klaus-Dieter Uelhoff, CDU
 Gunnar Uldall, CDU
 Wolfgang Ullmann, Bündnis 90/Die Grünen
 Hans-Eberhard Urbaniak, SPD

V 
 Siegfried Vergin, SPD
 Günter Verheugen, SPD
 Roswitha Verhülsdonk, CDU
 , CDU
 Hans-Jochen Vogel, SPD
 Wolfgang Vogt, CDU
 Hans-Peter Voigt, CDU
 Karsten Voigt, SPD
 Ruprecht Vondran, CDU
 Josef Vosen, SPD

W 
 Horst Waffenschmidt, CDU
 Hans-Georg Wagner, SPD
 Theodor Waigel, CSU
 Alois Graf von Waldburg-Zeil, CDU
 Hans Wallow, SPD
 Ernst Waltemathe, SPD
 Ralf Walter, SPD (from 10 June 1991 until 21 August 1994)
 Rudi Walther, SPD
 Ingrid Walz, FDP
 Jürgen Warnke, CSU
 Alexander Warrikoff, CDU
 Gerd Wartenberg, SPD
 Konstanze Wegner, SPD
 Wolfgang Weiermann, SPD
 Barbara Weiler, SPD (until 14 August 1994)
 Reinhard Weis, SPD
 Matthias Weisheit, SPD (from 29 June 1992)
 Konrad Weiß, Bündnis 90/Die Grünen
 Gunter Weißgerber, SPD
 Gert Weisskirchen, SPD
 Jochen Welt, SPD
 Wolfgang Weng, FDP
 Herbert Werner, CDU
 Axel Wernitz, SPD
 Hildegard Wester, SPD
 Lydia Westrich, SPD
 Inge Wettig-Danielmeier, SPD
 Kersten Wetzel, CDU
 Margrit Wetzel, SPD
 Gudrun Weyel, SPD
 Gabriele Wiechatzek, CDU
 Bertram Wieczorek, CDU (until 31 January 1994)
 Helmut Wieczorek, SPD
 Norbert Wieczorek, SPD
 Heidemarie Wieczorek-Zeul, SPD
 Dieter Wiefelspütz, SPD
 Dorothee Wilms, CDU
 Bernd Wilz, CDU
 Willy Wimmer, CDU
 Hermann Wimmer, SPD
 Roswitha Wisniewski, CDU
 Matthias Wissmann, CDU
 Hans de With, SPD
 Berthold Wittich, SPD
 Simon Wittmann, CSU
 Fritz Wittmann, CSU
 Verena Wohlleben, SPD
 Jürgen Wohlrabe, CDU (from 5 January 1993)
 Hanna Wolf, SPD
 Torsten Wolfgramm, FDP
 Vera Wollenberger, Bündnis 90/Die Grünen
 Michael Wonneberger, CDU
 Bernhard Worms, CDU (until 31 January 1991)
 Elke Wülfing, CDU
 Uta Würfel, FDP
 Peter Kurt Würzbach, CDU

Y 
 Cornelia Yzer, CDU

Z 
 Uta Zapf, SPD
 Wolfgang Zeitlmann, CSU
 Benno Zierer, CSU
 Wolfgang Zöller, CSU
 Christoph Zöpel, SPD
 Peter Zumkley, SPD (until 3 July 1991)
 Burkhard Zurheide, FDP
 Werner Zywietz, FDP

See also 
 Politics of Germany
 List of Bundestag Members

12